Mack Bruining (born 4 July 1997) is a Dutch basketball player for Yoast United of the BNXT League.

In his junior years, Bruining played for Crvena zvezda in Serbia and Lokomotief in the Dutch Talent League. He started his professional career in 2015 with Apollo Amsterdam of the Dutch Basketball League (DBL). After four seasons, he signed with Feyenoord.

On 16 June 2022, Bruining signed with Yoast United.

Personal
Mack is the son of Bareld Bruining, former player of RZ.

References

External links
Mack Bruining on Basketballleague.nl
Mack Bruining on RealGM

1997 births
Living people
Apollo Amsterdam players
Basketball players at the 2019 European Games
Dutch Basketball League players
Dutch men's basketball players
European Games competitors for the Netherlands
Feyenoord Basketball players
Point guards
Sportspeople from Rotterdam
21st-century Dutch people